Waly may refer to:

People
 Ghada Waly (born 1965), Egyptian politician
 Pape Waly Faye (born 1992), Senegalese football player
 Waly Coulibaly (born 1988), Malian basketball player
 Waly Salomão (1943–2003), Brazilian poet
 Yousef Wali, Egyptian politician

Places
 Waly, Meuse, Grand Est, France
 Wały, Lower Silesian Voivodeship, Poland
 Wały, Nidzica County, Poland
 Wały, Szczytno County, Poland
 Wały A, Kutno County, Poland
 Wały B, Kutno County, Poland
 Waly Diantang, Mauritania

Other
 WALY, American radio station

See also
 Wally (given name)